This article lists notable people with the given name Thomas.

 Thomas (bishop of the East Angles) (fl. ca. 647–648), medieval Christian bishop of Dunwich
 Sir Thomas à Beckett (1836–1919) was an Australian solicitor and judge
 Thomas Andrew (photographer) (1855–1939) was a New Zealand photographer who lived in Samoa from 1891
 Thomas Austin (pastoralist)(1815–1871) was an English settler in Australia who introduced rabbits into Australia in 1859
 Thomas Baker (artist) (1809–1864) was a Midlands landscape painter and watercolourist 
 Thomas Boylston Adams (1772–1832), Massachusetts legislator and judge and brother of John Quincy Adams
 Thomas Boylston Adams (1910–1997), Massachusetts executive, writer, and political candidate
 Thomas Amarasuriya (1907–1979), Sri Lankan planter and politician
 Thomas Aquinas (1225–1274), Italian philosopher and theologian
 Thomas Audley, 1st Baron Audley of Walden (c.1488 – 1544), English barrister and judge, Lord Chancellor
 Thomas Bardwell, English portrait and figure painter, art copyist, and writer
 Saint Thomas Becket, Archbishop of Canterbury from 1162 until his murder in 1170
 Thomas Boylston (1644–1695), early-American doctor and patriarch of the influential Boylston family of Massachusetts
 Thomas Blake Glover, Scottish merchant in Japan in the Bakumatsu and Meiji eras
 Thomas Bourchier (cardinal) (c.1411 – 1486), English cardinal and Lord Chancellor
 Thomas Brodie-Sangster (born 1990), English actor
 Thomas Bunday (1948–1983), American serial killer
 Tom Calma (born 1953), is an Australian First Nations human rights and social justice campaigner
 Thomas de Cantilupe, Lord Chancellor of England and Bishop of Hereford
 Thomas Carlyle (4 December 1795 – 5 February 1881) was a Scottish essayist, historian, and philosopher
 Thomas Child (1841-1898) was an English photographer and engineer
 Thomas J. Clayton (1826-1900), American lawyer and judge
 Thomas Sean Connery (1930–2020), Scottish actor
 Thomas Joshua Cooper(born 1946) is an American photographer
 Thomas Cornell (artist) (1937–2012) was an American artist
 Thomas Crotty (1912–1942), American Coast Guardsman held as POW during World War II
 Thomas Cromwell, English lawyer and statesman who served as chief minister to King Henry VIII
 Thomas Cooray (1901–1988), first Sri Lankan cardinal, Archbishop of Colombo 1947–1976
 Thomas D'Alesandro Jr. (1903–1987), American politician
 Thomas D'Alesandro III (1929–2019), American attorney and politician 
 Chris Thomas Devlin, American screenwriter
 Thomas Roderick Dew, professor and president of The College of William & Mary, influential pro-slavery advocate
 Thomas Dörflein (1963–2008), German zookeeper
 Thomas Doughty (artist) (1793–1856) was an American artist associated with the Hudson River School
 Sir Thomas Dyke Acland, 12th Baronet (1842–1919), British politician
 Thomas Edison, American inventor and businessman
 Thomas Edwards (artist) (1795–1869) was an artist in 19th-century Boston, Massachusetts, specializing in portraits
 Thomas Andrew Felton (born 1987), British actor known for his role in the Harry Potter films as Draco Malfoy
 Thomas Leigh Gatch (1891–1954), American naval officer and attorney
 Thomas Milton Gatch (1833–1913), American educator and politician
 Thomas Gibson (artist) (c.1680–1751) was an English portrait painter and copyist
 Thomas Godfrey (disambiguation), multiple people
 Thomas Gooch (artist) (1750 – 1802) was an English artist who specialised in painting animals
 Thomas Gottschalk (born 1950), German TV host and actor 
 Thomas Gottstein (born 1964), Swiss banker, CEO of Credit Suisse
 Thomas Graves (Royal Navy officer) (c.1747 – 1814), British naval officer
 Thomas Green (disambiguation), multiple people
 Thomas Hearne (artist) (1744–1817) was an English landscape painter, engraver and illustrator
 Thomas "Tom" Hiddleston (born 1981), English actor
 Thomas Higham (artist) (1795–1844) was an English artist specialising in an antiquary and topographical engravings
 Thomas Heffernan Ho (born 1989), Hong Kong equestrian
 Thomas Ho (born 1973), British actor
 Thomas Hobbes (1588-1679), English philosopher
 Thomas Hogan (artist) (1955–2014) was a Canadian First Nations artist
 Thomas Horton (soldier), English general and judge
 Thomas Howard, 1st Earl of Suffolk
 Thomas Howard, 4th Duke of Norfolk
 Thomas "Tom" Holland (born 1996), English actor
 Thomas Jefferson, 3rd President of the United States
 Thomas "Tom" Jones, Welsh singer
 Thomas Keneally (born 1935) is an Australian novelist, playwright, essayist, and actor.
 Thomas Leiper (1745-1825), Scottish-American businessman, banker and politician
 Thomas Lembong (born 1971), Indonesian politician
 Thomas Limpinsel (born 1965), German actor
 Thomas Lincoln, father of Abraham Lincoln
 Thomas Lincoln Jr., brother of Abraham Lincoln
 Thomas "Tad" Lincoln III, fourth son of Abraham Lincoln, whose nickname is Tad
 Thomas R. Marshall, American politician who served as the 28th vice president of the United States from 1913 to 1921
 Thomas Massie, United States Congressman from Kentucky
 Thomas Mathews, British officer of the Royal Navy, who rose to the rank of admiral
 Thomas "Tom" McClintock, American politician and U.S. Representative for California's 4th congressional district
 Thomas W. Merrill, American legal scholar
 Thomas F. Metz, lieutenant general in the United States Army
 Thomas More, English lawyer, social philosopher, author, statesman, and Renaissance humanist
 Thomas Müller (born 1989), German footballer
 Thomas Muster (born 1967), Austrian tennis player 
 Thomas Newson, Dutch DJ and electronic music producer
 Thomas Nihlén (born 1953), Swedish politician
 Thomas Nordahl, Swedish soccer player
 Thomas Noret, American politician
 Thomas Burton O'Connor (1914–1952), American journalist & editor
 Thomas O'Regan (1956–2020), Australian academic
 Thomas Orbos, Filipino businessman, government administrator, and politician
 Thomas Owen (Launceston MP) (1840–1898), British politician
 Thomas Paine American philosopher and political activist (1737-1809)
 Thomas Palaiologos (1409–1465), Despot of the Morea and brother of Constantine XI, the last Byzantine emperor
 Tom Pashby (1915–2005), Canadian ophthalmologist and sport safety advocate
 Thomas Paxton (1820–1887), Canadian industrial businessman and politician
 Thomas Pelham-Holles, 1st Duke of Newcastle, Prime Minister of Great Britain
 Thomas Pestock (born 1984), American professional wrestler known by his ring name Baron Corbin
 Thomas Quasthoff (born 1959), German opera singer
 Thomas De Quincey (1785–1859), English essayist
 Thomas Randolph (ambassador) (1523–1590), English diplomat and politician
 Thomas Randolph of Tuckahoe (1683–1729), Virginia politician
 Thomas Randolph (academic) (1701–1783), Vice-Chancellor of Oxford University
 Thomas Randolph, 1st Earl of Moray (died 1332), nephew and companion-in-arms of King Robert the Bruce
 Thomas Randolph, 2nd Earl of Moray (died 1332), son of the 1st Earl of Moray
 Thomas Beverly Randolph (1793–1867), American military officer
 Thomas Jefferson Randolph, grandson of Thomas Jefferson
 Thomas Mann Randolph Sr., father of Thomas Mann Randolph Jr.
 Thomas Mann Randolph Jr., son-in law of Thomas Jefferson
 Thomas Reynolds (Australian politician) (1818–1875) was the fifth Premier of South Australia
 Thomas Roma (formerly Thomas Germano; born 1950) is an American photographer 
 Thomas Ruff (born 1958) is a German photographer 
 Thomas Ryan (artist) (1929–2021) was an Irish artist, designer and medallist
 Thomas Saikhom, Indian footballer 
 Thomas de Sampayo (1855–1927), Sri Lankan judge
 Thomas Savundaranayagam (born 1938), Sri Lankan Tamil Roman Catholic priest, Bishop of Jaffna from 1992–2015
 Thomas Scott (entertainer), British educational YouTuber, game show host, and web developer
 Thomas "TomSka" Ridgewell, British YouTuber
 Thomas Sheraton (1751–1806), English furniture designer
 Thomas Simons (born 2004), British YouTuber and Twitch streamer known online as TommyInnit
 Thomas Smythe (artist) (1825–1906) was an English artist who painted landscapes, bucolic scenes and animals
 Thomas Stavngaard (born 1974), Danish badminton player
 Thomas Steinbeck (1944–2016) was a screenwriter, photographer, and journalist
 Thomas Strand (born 1954), Swedish politician
 Thomas Sutcliffe (artist) (1828–1871) was an English watercolour painter
 Thomas Sutton (1819 – 19 March 1875) English photographer, author, and inventor
 Thomas Tesche (born 1978), German badminton player
 Thomas Tuchel (born 1973), German football coach 
 Thomas Wedgwood (14 May 1771 – 10 July 1805) was an English photographer and inventor
 Thomas Wolsey, English archbishop, statesman and a cardinal of the Catholic Church
 Thomas Joseph Wynne (1838–1893) was an American–Irish photographer and shopkeeper
 Thomas Edward Yorke (born 1968), English musician and the main vocalist and songwriter of the rock band Radiohead
 Thomas Young (disambiguation), multiple people

See also 
 Thomas (name)
 Tomasz
 Tom (given name)
 Tommie
 Tommy (given name)
Thomas